is a retired Japanese footballer who last played for Kyoto Sanga FC.

Career
After more than a decade in J. League, he opted to retire at the end of the 2020 season.

Career statistics
Updated to January 1st, 2022.

References

External links
Profile at Ehime FC
Profile at Matsumoto Yamaga

1984 births
Living people
Kansai University alumni
Association football people from Shiga Prefecture
Japanese footballers
J1 League players
J2 League players
Kyoto Sanga FC players
Cerezo Osaka players
Matsumoto Yamaga FC players
Ehime FC players
Association football defenders